Massimo Birindelli (born 19 June 1956) is an Italian sports shooter. He competed in the men's 50 metre rifle prone event at the 1992 Summer Olympics.

References

1956 births
Living people
Italian male sport shooters
Olympic shooters of Italy
Shooters at the 1992 Summer Olympics
Sportspeople from Pisa